Robin John Shattock  (born February 1963) is professor of mucosal infection and immunity at the Faculty of Medicine, Imperial College London.

Education and early life
Shattock attended Lancing College, where he was initially more interested in acting and music than science.

Career and research
During the COVID-19 pandemic, Shattock led the British initiative to develop a vaccine for the disease at Imperial. He estimated in February 2020 that the vaccine for the disease would be available by early 2021.

Awards and honours
Shattock was elected a Fellow of the Academy of Medical Sciences (FMedSci) in 2017.

References 

Living people
1963 births
Academics of Imperial College London
Fellows of the Academy of Medical Sciences (United Kingdom)
British immunologists